Roy McCallum may refer to:

Roy McCallum (rugby league) (1913–1979), Australian rugby league player who played in the 1930s and 1940s
Roy McCallum (rugby union) (born 1946), former South African rugby union player

See also
 Ray McCallum, American college basketball coach
 Ray McCallum Jr., American basketball player